Digah (also, Digyakh, Digakh, Diqex, and Dygya) is a village and municipality in the Absheron Rayon of Azerbaijan.  It has a population of 3,050.

References 

Populated places in Absheron District